Yammine (يمين) is an Arabic surname. Notable people with the surname include:

Bassam Yammine (born 1968), Lebanese economist and banker
George Yammine (1955–2000), Lebanese poet, media manager, and literature and arts critic

See also
Yamin (disambiguation)

Arabic-language surnames